The 2002 Gujarat Legislative Assembly elections were held in December 2002; they necessitated by the resignation of Chief Minister Narendra Modi and the dissolution of the legislative assembly in July 2002, 8 months before its term was due to expire. Modi resigned due to widespread allegations that he had taken insufficient action to prevent the riots that took place a few months earlier. The ruling Bharatiya Janata Party was led by Modi, with the Indian National Congress being the chief opposition.

As a result of those communal riots, a major issue in the election was the place of Muslims in Gujarati society. Seeking to capitalize on the sentiments stirred up by the riots caused by burning of a train coach containing Hindu kar sevaks (including children) coming from Ayodhya.

The legislative assembly of Gujarat is elected from 182 constituencies, which were contested by a total of 21 parties and several hundred independent candidates. The Bharatiya Janata Party won 127 seats, thus achieving an absolute majority in the assembly. Modi was sworn in for a second term as chief minister.

Results

Elected members
The following candidates won election from their respective seats:

References

State Assembly elections in Gujarat
2000s in Gujarat
Gujarat